Ron Omara (born August 21, 1990) is a Canadian football linebacker who is currently a free agent. He was most recently a member of the Ottawa Redblacks of the Canadian Football League (CFL). He played CIS football with the St. Francis Xavier. He was selected in the fourth round, twenty-ninth overall by the Hamilton Tiger-Cats in the 2015 CFL Draft.

College career
Omara played 26 games in four seasons (2011–14) at St. Francis Xavier University. Omara was named St. FX rookie of the year in 2011. He recorded a career-high 47 tackles and three sacks in 2013, earning the AUS defensive player of the year award, while receiving AUS all-star honours, second team All-Canadian honours, and being named the team's most valuable player. He finished his college career with 158 defensive tackles, six quarterback sacks, four interceptions, five forced fumbles. He finished 10th in all-time tackles in AUS history (158.0).

Omara played junior football with the Cumberland Panthers and Ottawa Sooners.

Professional career

Hamilton Tiger-Cats 
Omara was drafted in the fourth round (twenty-ninth overall) by the Hamilton Tiger-Cats of the Canadian Football League in the 2015 CFL Draft. In two seasons with the Tiger-Cats Omara dressed for 25 games and contributed 8 special teams tackles and 1 defensive tackle. Following the 2016 season he was not re-signed by the Ti-Cats and became a free-agent.

Ottawa Redblacks 
Omara signed with the Ottawa Redblacks (CFL) on February 15, 2017, the second day of free agency. After not seeing much playing time in 2017 Omara was released by the Redblacks on January 18, 2018.

References

External links
Hamilton Tiger-Cats bio 
Ron Omara a Pro Football Prospect
CFL Bio
X-Men Ron Omara
Omara drafted 29th overall by Tiger-Cats

1990 births
Living people
Players of Canadian football from Quebec
Canadian football linebackers
Sportspeople from Gatineau
Hamilton Tiger-Cats players
St. Francis Xavier X-Men football players